Austin Deculus (born March 12, 1999) is an American football offensive tackle for the Houston Texans of the National Football League (NFL). He played college football at LSU.

Early years 
Deculus was born in Mamou, Louisiana, but grew up in Cypress, Texas, where he attended Cy-Fair High School. He was highly regarded as an offensive line prospect coming out of high school, being ranked the No. 5 offensive tackle prospect by ESPN.

College football career

2017 season 

In his freshman season at LSU, Deculus played in all 13 games on special teams, appearing only twice on the offensive line due to injuries to the team's starters.

2018 season 

In the second week of his sophomore season, Deculus had his first start at left tackle in a game against Southeastern Louisiana. He shifted to right tackle the following week and started there for the remainder of the season. He finished the year with a total of 827 snaps played, including all 86 snaps in the Fiesta Bowl.

2019 season 

Deculus was considered the "most improved" offensive lineman at LSU in 2019 and started 13 games, missing two due to injury. He played every snap in the Tigers' national championship win over Clemson, totaling 885 snaps over the whole season.

2020 season 

Deculus started all ten games at right tackle in 2020, and was named to the 2020 SEC Academic Honor Roll.

2021 season 

Deculus took advantage of an extra year of eligibility due to the COVID-19 pandemic as he entered his fifth year playing for the Tigers. In 12 games, he played a total of 829 snaps, and recorded his only college football tackle in a game against UCLA.

Professional football career 
Deculus was selected in the sixth round of the 2022 NFL Draft by the Houston Texans with the 205th pick overall. The Texans had previously selected his LSU teammate Derek Stingley Jr. in the first round of the draft.

References

External links
 Houston Texans bio
 LSU Tigers bio

1999 births
Living people
American football offensive linemen
Houston Texans players
LSU Tigers football players
People from Cypress, Texas
Players of American football from Texas